Jaya Prakash Malla (also known as Jayaprakash Malla) was the last king of Kantipur (Nepal bhasa. यें) which corresponds to present-day Kathmandu. He ruled from 1736 to 1746 after succeeding his father Jagajjaya Malla, and then from 1750 until his death in 1769.

Early Life 
Jayaprakash Malla's elder brother and the heir apparent of Kantipur Rajendra Malla died when he was young. Some courtiers and nobles requested the king that Jayaprakash's younger brother Rajyaprakash be declared the heir instead of Jayaprakash. Jayaprakash's rivalry with the nobles began after the king decided that Jayaprakash would succeed him after his death.

Reign

Conflict with brothers 
He ascended the throne after his father died in 1736. Suspecting a coup from his brother and the nobles, he expelled his brother Rajyaprakash during the time of mourning of his father. Rajyaprakash was adopted as the heir by Vishnu Malla, the then King of Patan.

After a short while, some palace officials conspired and proclaimed his younger brother Narendraprakash as the ruler of north-eastern part of the kingdom. Jayaprakash defeated Narendraprakash after four months and Narendraparakash fleed to Bhadgaon where he died.

Invasion from Gorkha 
In 1737, Narabhupal Shah of Gorkha attacked Nuwakot but was quickly defeated by Jayaprakash Malla.

In 1744, Prithvi Narayan Shah attacked Nuwakot again and annexed it from Kantipur.

When Prithvi Narayan Shah attacked Nuwakot, a protectorate of Kantipur, Jaya Prakash Malla sent troops under Kashiram Thapa. The battle occurred in 1746 where Kashiram Thapa lost the war and Jaya Prakash Malla thought of deceit. Jaya Prakash Malla was angered and killed him. In the day of Indrajatra , when there was festival going on, Prithvi Narayan Shah attacked Yen (Kantipur). Jaya Prakash Malla was helpless and he went to Lalitpur to seek asylum. Tej Narasimha Malla ruled that kingdom. After some time Prithvi Narayan Shah attacked Lalitpur and Jaya Prakash Malla along with Tej Narasimha Malla ran to Bhaktapur to seek asylum. When Prithvi Narayan Shah attacked Bhaktapur, Ranajit Malla surrendered. Later, Ranajit Malla was sent to Kashi to spend rest of his life; Jaya Prakash Malla died and Tej Narasimha Malla was kept in lifetime detention.

Literary works 
He contributed to the literature of Nepal Bhasa with works such as "Padma Samuchaya" and three dramas that were concerned with Hindu mythology being Ratneshwar Pradurbhav, Birdhwojopakhyan Natakam and Bhairavpradurbhav.

References

Further reading

Malla rulers of Kantipur
1768 deaths
Year of birth unknown
Newar-language writers
People of the Nepalese unification
18th-century Nepalese people
Nepalese Hindus